Anthidium rotundoscutellare is a species of bee in the family Megachilidae, the leaf-cutter, carder, or mason bees.

Distribution
Africa

References

rotundoscutellare
Insects described in 1984